Odontamblyopus rebecca is a species of eel goby native to marine and brackish waters of Vietnam.  This species can reach a length of  SL.  This species is mostly known from several specimens collected from a fish market in Haiphong, Vietnam.

Etymology
The specific name honours Edward O. Murdy's wife Rebecca Rootes.

References

Amblyopinae
Fish of Vietnam
Endemic fauna of Vietnam
Fish described in 2003